Janko de Beer (born February 24, 1980)  is a South African sculptor and visual artist, based in Somerset West, South Africa.

Career 
De Beer obtained his law degree (LLB) in 2003 and practiced as an Advocate of the High Court of South Africa for 12 years. In 2005, De Beer started his career as a sculptor. In 2010, he had his first solo sculpture exhibition in Cape Town at Long Street Gallery. In 2014, he landed exhibition space in his first group show at Cape Town's Youngblood Gallery. The natural shapes and textures of dried-out bull kelp collected from various beaches around South Africa inspire his current work. Over the years, He participated in many group exhibitions.

Selected art works 

2021
 Metamorphosis, Creation Wine Estate, Hermanus, SA 
 Solo exhibition, Denzil's & Jo, Johannesburg, South Africa
 Motion Bandits (skateboard art benefitting ladles of love), Galleryone11, Cape Town, SA

2020
 Klein Karoo Nasionale Kunstefees,  Oudtshoorn, SA
 Hermanus FynKuns,  Hermanus, SA

2018
 The Turbine Art Fair (TAF), S Gallery, Johannesburg, SA
 Bespoke Art Auction, Little Angels, Idiom Wine Estate, Cape Town, SA
 Dennis Goldberg Art Auction, S Gallery, Johannesburg, SA
 First Thursday Group Exhibition, Youngblood Gallery, Cape Town, SA
 Group exhibition, RED Gallery, Constantia, SA

2016
 Solo exhibition, ODA Gallery, Franschhoek, SA
 Group exhibition, S Gallery, Houtbay, SA

2015 
 Nature, group exhibition, Oude Libertas Gallery, Stellenbosch, SA
 Horse, group exhibition, Oude Libertas Gallery, Stellenbosch, SA 
 The Nature of Art, group exhibition, ABSA KKNK, Oudshoorn, SA

2014
 Equus exhibition, Cavalli Estate, Somerset West, SA 
 First Thursday Group Exhibition, Youngblood Gallery, Cape Town, SA 
 Group exhibition, Youngblood Gallery, Cape Town, SA

2010
 Solo exhibition, Long Street Gallery, Cape Town, SA

2008
 Group exhibition, Artapart Gallery, Muizenberg, SA

2007
 Group exhibition, Breytenbach Gallery, Wellington, SA

2006
 Group exhibition, Drop Street Theatre Gallery, Stellenboch, SA

References 

1980 births
Living people
South African artists
South African sculptors